City of Mist is an urban fantasy neo-noir detective tabletop role-playing game (RPG) designed by Amít Moshe and published by Son of Oak Game Studio. The game is set in a modern-day metropolis where ordinary people of all walks of life become modern-day reincarnations of myths, legends, and fairy tales, gaining magical powers and abilities.

The game's narrative driven engine is partially based on the Powered by the Apocalypse game engine and the tag system featured in free RPG Lady Blackbird. The cinematic tone of the game is inspired by film noir and detective graphic novels as well as street-level detective superhero TV shows.

Publication history 
Crowdfunding for the original game was launched on Kickstarter in 2016 which generated 1,762 backers, raising $104,313, or nearly $90,000 over its original $14,000 goal. It was then released in 2017. Amit Moshe was inspired to design City of Mist after writing a modern retelling of Cú Chulainn. In 2018, the game was picked up by publishing partner Modiphius Entertainment.

The original release contained the rules in a single Core Book. A subsequent 2019 release reorganized the rules into two separate rulebooks, the Player's Guide and the Master of Ceremonies' Toolkit, in an effort to make the game's literature less "daunting for new players" and "more accessible to everyone." A second Kickstarter was also launched in 2019 for a new City of Mist Starter Box which was then released as a standalone product in November 2020. In 2020, support for running the game on Roll20 was released along with an online organized play program.

Game system
In City of Mist'''s character creation process, characters are described using exclusively words ("tags") – there are no stats or numerical values of any kind. "Player characters are people called 'Rifts,' who can draw on the powers of mythical heroes and creatures to fight enemies and solve paranormal mysteries".

The action resolution system in City of Mist is a heavily modified version of the Apocalypse World game engine. Player characters utilize specific "Moves" which can be "augmented by their Themes and Tags, to try to accomplish their goals"; players roll 2d6 to resolve these "Moves".

The game uses two types of character development systems side by side. Gaining Attention points allows players to add power tags and unlock theme improvements similar to gaining experience points in other systems. The more substantial character development mechanic focuses on the pull between the mundane and the mythical.

 Reception City of Mist was praised on Geek & Sundry, saying "The mechanics are simple yet INCREDIBLY robust" and the game featured in Geek & Sundry's December 2017 RPG Buyer's Guide and 2018 Best Role-Playing Games. Joshua Nelson, for Bleeding Cool, wrote that the game "hits me with the classic noir-mystery tropes. [...] City Of Mist is all about a world inhabited by legendary figures – think King Arthur or the biblical Job, or even Little Red Riding Hood – who have been affected by an arcane force of nature of sorts, called The Mist, that makes them live a more mundane life than this. It's rather like The Matrix's namesake meets Once Upon A Time, perhaps. Regardless of its inspiration, City Of Mist deals with a handful of these myths and legends contending with both their roles in their stories and the humdrum of everyday living. I'm game for this".

Giaco Furino, for TechRaptor, highlighted that "City of Mist takes an incredible idea and gives it player agency in its setting and gameplay. I really like the way the real world and the magical world are sort of tethered to each other, and playing the game means paying attention to both. You can’t just go swinging Excalibur around all day, you’ve also got to make rent, and figure out what happened to that kidnapped kid, and call your mom for her birthday. If you like that sort of tension between the modern world and the mystical, then this game is absolutely going to hit the mark for you".

Richard Jansen-Parkes, for the UK print magazine Tabletop Gaming, wrote that "style and drama ooze from every page of this beautiful book. It takes a little more effort to crack than most story-driven games, but when things click it offers something truly special." Tomás Giménez Rioja, for Tribality, highlighted that "some mechanics [...] could need some improvements but are good enough to make the game, if played correctly, a very fun game."

 Awards and nominations 

 Books and supplements 

 Core Books 
 City of Mist: Quick Start Rules – free PDF with the basic rules, seven pre-generated characters, and two starting case scenarios: V is for Going Viral and Demons in Cross End City of Mist Player's Guide (2019) – setting introduction and description of the ruleset, character creation, and character evolution
 City of Mist Master of Ceremonies' Toolkit (2019) – contains guides for running the game and writing cases, a bestiary of crooks and villains, and the sample case scenario Gambling with Death Supplements 
 City of Mist Starter Box (2020) – box set which includes the basic rules for both players and game masters, the Shark Tank case scenario, and additional accessories such as five pre-generated player character folios and diceCity of Mist Shadows and Showdowns (2020) – an expansion to the core rule system, story mechanics, and the game's canon
 City of Mist Nights of Payne Town (2020) – an extensive story arc split up into ten related case scenarios

 Accessories 
 City of Mist Character Folio Pack (2021) – fourteen pre-generated player character folios; includes the seven original starter set characters and seven new characters along with a rules summary on each folio

 Out of print Starter Set – free PDF with the basic rules
 City of Mist Core Book'' (2017) – the original version of the game; both core books in a single 512-page volume

References 

2017 books
2019 books
ENnies winners
Role-playing games introduced in 2017